Roselyn Elizabeth Payne Epps (December 11, 1930 - September 29, 2014) was an American pediatrician and public health physician. She was the first African American president of the American Medical Women's Association and wrote more than 90 professional articles. She died on September 29, 2014.

Early life
Epps was born in December 11, 1930 in Little Rock, Arkansas, but grew up in Savannah, Georgia. She attended Howard University in Washington D.C. where she majored in zoology and chemistry and continued her medical education there, graduating in 1955.

Career
Epps earned her master's in public health from Johns Hopkins University in 1973, after completing her residency and working at the Bureau of Maternal and Child Health at the D.C. Department of Public Health for 10 years.

While working at the D.C. Department of Health Epps held many titles such as chief of the Infant and Preschool Division, director of the Children and Youth Project, and chief of the Bureau of Maternal and Child Health. Epps was appointed to the position of commissioner of public health in the Department of Public Health in D.C. in 1980, where she supervised 3,000 employees and managed a $35 million budget.

From 1984 to 1989 Epps, acting as chief of Child Development Division and director of the Child Development Center at Howard University, worked on a project to help identify children with learning disabilities and assist them, their schools, and their parents.

Epps was a scientific program administrator at the National Cancer Institute of the National Institutes of Health from 1995 to 1998. During this time she focused on spreading knowledge about smoking prevention and cessation research results both nationally and internationally. In a separate project, she focused on cancer screening and diagnosis.

In 1988, Epps was the first woman and the first African American to become president of the American Academy of Pediatrics, Washington D.C. chapter. Three years later, she was elected as president of the American Medical Women's Association (AMWA). She was also the first African American to hold this position. A year after that, in 1992, Epps was the first African American woman to become president of the Medical Society of the District of Columbia.

Epps also established the D.C. metropolitan area chapter of Girls, Inc.

As the national president of the AMWA, she worked on establishing the AMWA Foundation, which funds its women's health initiatives and to support advocacy for research, volunteer services and scholarship programs.

Major works
Epps has authored more than 90 professional articles, 16 of which were published as chapters of books. She also co-edited The Women's Complete Healthbook and Developing a Child Care Program.

Awards
Foremother Award from the National Center for Health Research, 2007

References

Further reading

External links

American pediatricians
Women pediatricians
2014 deaths
American public health doctors
Johns Hopkins School of Medicine alumni
Howard University College of Medicine alumni
African-American women physicians
National Institutes of Health people
20th-century American women physicians
20th-century American physicians
1930 births
20th-century African-American women
20th-century African-American physicians
21st-century African-American people
21st-century African-American women
Women public health doctors